Bel-Air refers to both a private subdivision, a gated community and a barangay in Makati Philippines. To the north  the village itself is bound by Neptune, Anza, Orion, Mercedes and Amapola Streets. Estrella Street on the northeast, Epifanio de los Santos Avenue on the southeast, Jupiter Street on the southwest and Nicanor Garcia Street (formerly Reposo) on the northwest. Bel-Air Village was developed in four phases. There are 950 lots, thirty-two streets and two well-developed parks in Phases II and III, each with covered badminton/basketball courts. Makati Avenue separates Phase II from the rest of the subdivision.

The village is managed by the Bel-Air Village Association (BAVA) and comprises only a portion of Barangay Bel-Air, which now includes Ayala North, Gil Puyat Avenue (Buendia Avenue), the Ayala Triangle and the entire Salcedo Village. The current Barangay Captain is Constancia Lichauco.

History
In the early part of the 20th century, the area currently occupied by Bel-Air Village was part of the former Nielson Airport at Nielson Field on the old Hacienda de San Pedro Macati, then part of the province of Rizal. At that time, this airport and the Grace Park Airfield in Caloocan were the only commercial flight servers of Manila. The runways of Nielson Airport were wide and macadamized roads that are now the major thoroughfares known as Ayala Avenue and Paseo de Roxas. Philippine Airlines, which was then owned by Don Andres Soriano, Sr., operated domestic flights from Manila to Baguio and Paracale, with 9-passenger twin engine planes flown by American pilots.

During World War II, the airport was taken over first by the United States Far East Air Force, halting all commercial flights. The airport was later sequestered and converted into Japanese military headquarters during the Japanese occupation. After the liberation of Manila, control of the airport reverted to the Americans. All services were restored between 1945–46 and continued until 1948, when the U.S. Air Force turned Nichols Field over to the Philippine government. President Manuel Roxas then transferred all commercial air operations from Nielson to Nichols, despite the intense lobbying of the Ayalas and Sorianos.

This move was the most significant turning point in the development of the Ayala-owned property. Col. Joseph McMicking, the husband of Doña Mercedes de Ayala, who was at the time the major shareholder of the Ayala Corporation, had visualized a future financial, business and commercial center with residential villages occupying periphery of the now vacant Nielson Airport. In the early 1950s, Col. McMicking lured Manila's influential entrepreneurs and business leaders to move their residences to Forbes Park at a land price of only eight pesos per square meter. These financial luminaries later built their corporate headquarters along Ayala Avenue and Paseo de Roxas. San Lorenzo Village was subsequently developed in 1954 for the executives and the upper middle class.

In 1956, the Philippine Airlines Pilots Union (ALPAP), composed of over two hundred former Philippine Air Force and U.S. Air Force pilots, requested a subdivision from the Ayala Corporation. Through the efforts of Capt. Antonio O'Brien, who was then the President of ALPAP, and with the support of his friend Col. McMicking, Phase I of Bel-Air Village was opened in 1957 at the price of fifteen pesos per square meter for pilots and thirty pesos per square meter for non-pilots. Bel-Air Village officially became the third subdivision to be developed by the Ayala Corporation. Capt. O'Brien chose the name Bel-Air as the pilots wanted a name that included the word "air."

Other than the Rizal Theatre at the corner of Makati and Ayala Avenues, there was not a single building along the avenues of Buendia, Paseo de Roxas, Makati and Ayala. After seeing the vast area of cogon and talahib abundant in the area, only 100 pilots signed up and about 50-odd pilots erected houses. Others sold their rights at a handsome profit.

From the first house and residence of Capt. Charlie Deen at 2 Polaris Street corner Mars Street in Phase I, Bel-Air Village later blossomed into four phases with over 900 home owners. Ms. Judith Deen, the widow of the first resident, and her siblings still live at their 1957 house, while the widow of Capt. O'Brien, the former Philippine film actress known as Paraluman, just recently moved out of their house at Polaris Street.

Bel-Air Village was incorporated and registered with the Securities and Exchange Commission in 1957. The subdivision's deed restrictions for residential lots have remained in force since January 15, 1957. These restrictions officially expired in 2007, but were renewed by votation and extended for another twenty-five years.

Community Services
The Bel-Air Village Community Center is located on 40 Solar Street, adjacent to the BAVA office, the Bel-Air Security Headquarters and Bel-Air III Park. The Community Center hosts a clinic, the Bel-Air Post Office Extension, the Bel-Air Fitness Gym, and two function rooms for the use of village residents in good standing. Gym membership is open to residents and their visitors, with corresponding fees. Two covered badminton/basketball courts are located at the parks on Juno and Hercules Streets in Bel-Air II and on Solar Street in Bel-Air III.

Barangay Bel-Air offers other extension services such as free ambulance service through Lifeline Arrows, and the Continuing Education Program for English Proficiency for household help, security and maintenance personnel, in cooperation with the Department of Education and the Mapua Institute of Technology. More subjects like math and science will be offered in the future, in line with Makati's Non-Formal Education Program.

Recognition
As of 2005, Bel-Air was proclaimed the Cleanest and Greenest Barangay, Cluster I in the City of Makati, for the eighth record-breaking consecutive year. As a result, the barangay has been inducted into Makati's Clean and Green Hall of Fame.

Culture
Bel-Air Village's Pasinaya, which means thanksgiving, has been held annually since 1993 as a way of fostering community spirit and promoting camaraderie among its residents.  The yearly celebration usually consists of a variety of events held during the month of April at the Bel-Air Phase III Park, featuring various food stalls, bazaars, entertainment, games and perya rides.

During the rest of the year, cultural events are organized to provide entertainment for the residents. For example, the Night of Music concert held on February 16, 2007, at the Bel-Air Multipurpose Court featured the Four Seasons Chamber Orchestra with Maestro Ali Delilah. This concert was presented in cooperation with the Italian Embassy, the Makati city government, the Department of Tourism and the National Commission for Culture and the Arts; sponsored by the Cultural Center of the Philippines and the Women of Bel-Air.

References

BAVA Handbook (2006)
Bel-Air Village Association Website
Barangay Bel-Air Website
Makati City Government joins Barangay Bel-Air in ‘Pasinaya 2004’
335th "Araw Ng Makati" Celebration Begins With Pasinaya 2005

External links
Bel-Air Village Association, Inc.
Barangay Bel-Air

Barangays of Metro Manila
Makati
Districts in Metro Manila
Gated communities in Metro Manila